Buena Vista, Indiana may refer to:
Buena Vista, Franklin County, Indiana
Buena Vista, Gibson County, Indiana
Buena Vista, Harrison County, Indiana
Buena Vista, Randolph County, Indiana